Six Million Ways to Live is an album by Dub Pistols, released in 2005. It was originally released in 2001 as a promotional CD with a different track list. Its single, "Problem Is" featuring Terry Hall, charted at No. 66 on the UK Singles Chart in 2003.

Track listing
 "Sound Clash" - 1:14
 "World Gone Crazy" (featuring Horace Andy) -04:42
 "Problem Is" (featuring Terry Hall) - 3:47
 "Six Million Ways to Live" - 5:05
 "Riptides" - 4:41
 "Soul Shaking" - 4:16
 "Soldiers" (featuring Planet Asia) - 6:06
 "Still Breathing" - 3:31
 "Architect" - 3:31
 "Official Chemical" - 3:17
 "6AM" - 3:55

2001 promo track listing
 "Soldiers" (featuring Planet Asia) - 6:01
 "Big World" - 5:04
 "Problem Is" (featuring Terry Hall) - 3:43
 "Official Chemical" - 3:31
 "3am" - 3:40
 "Six Million Ways to Live" - 5:04
 "Revolution" - 5:03
 "Crazy" (a.k.a. "World Gone Crazy") (featuring Horace Andy) - 4:39
 "Riptides" - 4:37
 "Soul Shaking (Conduct Disorderly)" - 4:23
 "Architect" - 3:37
 "Together as One" - 5:38

References

2005 albums
Dub Pistols albums